The IHF World Player of the Year is a handball award given annually to the player who is considered to have performed the best in the previous season, both at club and international competitions. It is awarded based on votes from experts, media and fans.

About
The award was awarded by IHF since 1988 in both Men's and Women's Category separately.

No award was awarded in the years 1991, 1992, 1993 and 2017.

Men

Women

Previous awards
While the IHF has only reported awards since 1988, other players have been voted best players in the world before.

Thus, the Romanian Ștefan Birtalan was elected World Player of the Year in 1974, 1976 and 1977. And Ioan Moser of Romania was also named "Best Handball Player in the World” in 1964.

Best players of all time 
In 1992, Gheorghe Gruia of Romania was named Best Player of All Time by the International Handball Federation.

In 2000, the Swedish Magnus Wislander and the Ukrainian Zinaida Turchyna were elected Players of the 20th Century by the IHF.

Additionally, in 2010 Ivano Balić of Croatia and Svetlana Kitić of Yugoslavia were voted by the website users the Best Players Ever, but they were not named directly by the IHF.

Team of the century
In 2000, the official bulletin of the  International Handball Federation, World Handball Magazine, chose Gheorghe Gruia, Ioan Moser and Cornel Penu as members of the "Team of the Century".

Other awards
In 2010, the fans voted Thierry Omeyer as world's best goalkeeper ever. And in 2011, the fans voted for Luminița Dinu (born Huțupan) as best female goalkeeper ever.

Previously in 2009, Steffen Fäth and Cristina Neagu respectively won Rookie of the Year award for male and female.

See also 
EHF Players of the Year

References

External links
All the previous World Handball Players on the IHF homepage
World Handball Awards on the IHF homepage

International Handball Federation awards
Awards established in 1988